Armando Enrique Hart Dávalos (June 13, 1930 – November 26, 2017) was a Cuban politician and a Communist leader. His grandfather was born in Georgia, USA and emigrated to Cuba as a child.

Biography
Before the Cuban Revolution which ousted President Fulgencio Batista, Hart studied to be a lawyer at the University of Havana. While there, he became politically active and would soon join Fidel Castro and Che Guevara in their fight against Batista. As Castro and Che Guevara were leading the guerrilla warfare in the Cuban mountains and jungles, Hart went onto become one of the main organizers of the revolutionary movement in the cities. Among his other writings, he has given a very full account of events leading up to the Revolution of 1959 in his seminal work, Aldabonazo.

When Batista was finally overthrown, Hart was made the first Minister of Education of the Revolution, and later served as the Minister of Culture (1976-1997), as well as a member of the Politburo of the Communist Party of Cuba.

In January 2005, Hart wrote an article on Joseph Stalin, in which he denounced the ideas of Stalinism and its practice, while defending the ideas of Karl Marx, Vladimir Lenin, Fidel Castro, and Leon Trotsky.

Armando Hart was the father of Celia Hart.

He became minister of culture since the creation of that ministry on 1976 to 1997. He was then appointed director of the Office of José Martí's Program. Hart was the president of the José Martí Cultural Society (Sociedad Cultural José Martí) at the time of this death.

Orders and honors
Order of José Martí (June 13, 2010)

References

External links

 Armando Hart Receives Award from Cuban Journalists
 ACN: Dominican University Grants Honoris Causa Degree to Cuban Scholar
 Armando Hart Dávalos on ctp.iccas.miami.edu

1930 births
2017 deaths
Communist Party of Cuba politicians
Education ministers of Cuba
Culture ministers of Cuba
People of the Cuban Revolution
People from Havana
Cuban people of American descent